Liena Vayzman (born 1971) is an American photographer, art historian and curator. Her work is included in the collections of the Whitney Museum of American Art and the RISD Museum.

References

1971 births
American photographers
American women photographers
Living people
21st-century American women